Douchi or tochi   (also known as fermented black soybeans, Chinese fermented black beans, salted black beans, salty black beans, or just black beans) is a type of fermented and salted black soybean most popular in the cuisine of China, where they are most widely used for making black bean sauce dishes.

Douchi is made by fermenting and salting black soybeans.  The black type soybean is most commonly used and the process turns the beans soft, and mostly semi-dry (if the beans are allowed to dry).  Regular soybeans (white soybeans) are also used, but this does not produce "salted black beans"; instead, these beans become brown. The smell is sharp, pungent, and spicy; the taste  is salty, somewhat bitter and sweet.  The product made with white soybeans is called mianchi.

Douchi, "Chinese salted black beans", and "black soybeans" are not the same as the black turtle bean, a variety of common bean that is commonly used in the cuisines of Central America, South America, and the Caribbean.

History
Fermented black soybeans are the oldest-known food made from soybeans. In 165 BCE, they were placed, clearly marked, in Han Tomb No. 1 at Mawangdui Tomb Site in South Central China. The tomb was sealed  about 165 BCE and was first opened in 1972.  The high-ranking woman to whom the undisturbed tomb belonged was probably the wife of the first Marquis of Tai. 

In 90 BCE, in the Records of the Grand Historian by Sima Qian, Chapter 69, refers to 1,000 earthenware vessels of mold-fermented cereal grains and salty fermented soybeans (shi). They were now an important commodity in China. When the prince of Huainan (legendary inventor of tofu) was exiled for inciting rebellion (in 173 BCE) against his brother, the Han Emperor Wendi,  his retinue and he were, nevertheless, provided with such necessities of life as firewood, rice, salt, shi (fermented black soybeans), and cooking utensils. This date, 173 BCE, is before Han Tomb No. 1 at Mawangdui was sealed.

Use

It is used as an ingredient for mapo tofu. Douchi is also used to flavor fish or stir-fried vegetables (particularly bitter melon and leaf vegetables). Unlike some other fermented soybean-based foods such as natto or tempeh, douchi is used only as a seasoning, and is not meant to be consumed in large quantities, being typically much saltier.

Small packets of douchi are available wherever Chinese foods are sold.

Some common dishes made with douchi are steamed spare ribs with fermented black beans and chili pepper (豉椒排骨), and braised mud carp with fermented black beans (豆豉鯪魚).

Around the world
Fermented black soybeans are an ancient traditional food, used as condiments and seasonings in many Far Eastern countries and Chinese diaspora communities, where they are known by a variety of names.

In Japanese, douchi is also referred to as daitokuji natto, hamanatto, hamananatto, shiokara-natto, and tera-natto, sometimes using the same Han characters (豆豉), similar ones (豆鼓), or completely different ones; however, they are almost never known by their Chinese name Zushi (豆豉 or ずし)
In Korea, a similar black bean sauce made from roasted soy beans called chunjang is used in the well-known jjajangmyeon. It was first introduced by Chinese settlers in Incheon in the early 20th century; chunjang has made several changes and evolutionary steps over time.
In Thailand, this sauce is called เต้าซี่ ("tausi") and is made from the black soybean. Normally, Chinese Thais use it for original old Chinese recipe such as sauce, steam etc.
In Vietnam, this sauce is called tàu xì or đậu xị and is made from the black soybean.
In Cambodia, douchi is also referred to as seang, or fermented salted bean, in the Khmer language, and is a common recipe. It is often used with the fermented salted fish  prahok.
In Philippine cuisine, it is called tausi in Cebuano and Tagalog, both derived from the Lan-nang tāu-sīⁿ (豆豉). It is often used when steaming fish.
 In Cantonese-speaking regions, douchi is referred to as dau6si6 ("douchi") or hak1dau2 dau6si6 ("black-bean douchi").
In Chinese Indonesian cuisine, it is called tausi which is derived from its Hokkien name. It is usually used in kakap tahu tausi, which is stir-fried red snapper, tofu, and douchi.
 In Malaysia it is called kacang cibai  or soya chibae .
In Spanish-speaking parts of Latin America, douchi is commonly referred to as tausí or tau-sí.
Similar African fermented products are ogiri and iru.

Black bean paste
A condiment called black bean paste, black bean sauce (豆豉醬), or black bean garlic sauce (蒜蓉豆豉酱), Tochidjan (豆豉醬), prepared from douchi, garlic, and soy sauce, is popular in Chinese cuisine.

See also

 List of fermented foods
 List of fermented soy products
Yellow soybean paste

References

Fermented soy-based foods
Umami enhancers
Indonesian Chinese cuisine